Parchment is a city in Kalamazoo County in the U.S. state of Michigan. The 2010 census recorded a population of 1,804. The name is derived from the parchment company that used to manufacture paper on the East bank of the Kalamazoo River.

Parchment is located just northeast of the city of Kalamazoo, and it is mostly surrounded by Kalamazoo Township.

History 
The Kalamazoo Vegetable Parchment Company was founded in 1909. The founder, Jacob "Uncle Jake" Kindleberger, set up shop along the Kalamazoo River. The company then started selling pieces of land located around the mill to the mill workers. In 1932, Kindleberger left a tract of  located in the center of the city; this later became Kindleberger Park in his honor. In 1939, Parchment became a city by a majority vote. It has been known as The Paper City since then. Over the years, the KVP Company was bought by or merged with other companies, including Sutherland Paper Company, Brown Company, James River, and finally Crown-Vantage. In 2000 paper making in Parchment ended, and thereafter the city has struggled to sustain itself. Its population has debated what to do with the old paper mill property. As of 2011, the first mill building was demolished with plans to demolish the other building at a later date.

Contamination 
The mill site came under scrutiny again in July 2018, when the city discovered fluorosurfactant (PFAS) contamination in the drinking water. Samples from Parchment's water system showed the drinking water was contaminated with PFAS at a level of 1,587-ppt—over 20 times the EPA limit. Residents were advised to stop using the water for drinking/cooking immediately, while the city worked to discover the source of the contamination. Michigan Governor Rick Snyder declared a State of Emergency on July 29. Bottled water was distributed to residents by volunteers, and the City of Kalamazoo connected its water system to Parchment. Because of the unknown source of the PFAS, and the associated costs for new wells and testing, Mayor Robert Britigan III predicted that Parchment will have to permanently use Kalamazoo's drinking water.

The source of the PFAS contamination has not been discovered, but officials believe a former  landfill along the Kalamazoo River may be the source. The landfill site is also the former home of the paper mill in the city, and the landfill was capped in 2000 after then-owner Crown-Vantage went bankrupt. PFAS have been known to be used in paper-making and associated paper-manufacturing processes.

Geography

Parchment is east of the Kalamazoo River.

Demographics

In the November 2010 gubernatorial election, 588 ballots were cast in the city of Parchment.

Schools
The city of Parchment has three elementary schools, one middle school, one high school, and Barclay Hills Education Center, an alternative public school. Parchment High School was built in 1959 to accommodate the city's growing population. Prior to 1959, Parchment students went through 8th grade and then went to Kalamazoo Central High School. In the mid 1950s Kalamazoo Public school district was considering annexing Parchment into their district. Laurence Tisch, who read water meters for the city started a petition with his wife Jean Tisch to build a new High School. The community was successful in purchasing property and the school was built. The first class graduated in 1961.

2010 census
As of the census of 2010, there were 1,804 people, 786 households, and 484 families residing in the city. The racial makeup of the city was 84.6% White, 8.5% African American, 0.2% Native American, 1.3% Asian, 1.3% from other races, and 4.0% from two or more races. Hispanic or Latino of any race were 3.4% of the population.

There were 786 households, of which 31.0% had children under the age of 18 living with them, 40.2% were married couples living together, 16.9% had a female householder with no husband present, 4.5% had a male householder with no wife present, and 38.4% were non-families. 32.4% of all households were made up of individuals, and 9.1% had someone living alone who was 65 years of age or older. The average household size was 2.30 and the average family size was 2.89.

The median age in the city was 38.5 years. 24.2% of residents were under the age of 18; 8.8% were between the ages of 18 and 24; 26.3% were from 25 to 44; 28.9% were from 45 to 64; and 12% were 65 years of age or older. The gender makeup of the city was 46.2% male and 53.8% female.

2000 census
As of the census of 2000, there were 1,936 people, 822 households, and 531 families residing in the city. The racial makeup of the city was 92.67% White, 4.18% African American, 0.01% Sicilian, 0.31% Native American, 0.67% Asian, 0.36% from other races, and 1.81% from two or more races. Hispanic or Latino of any race were 0.93% of the population.

There were 822 households, out of which 34.1% had children under the age of 18 living with them, 45.4% were married couples living together, 16.1% had a female householder with no husband present, and 35.3% were non-families. 31.4% of all households were made up of individuals, and 9.9% had someone living alone who was 65 years of age or older.  The average household size was 2.34 and the average family size was 2.94.

In the city, the population was spread out, with 27.2% under the age of 18, 8.0% from 18 to 24, 29.6% from 25 to 44, 22.2% from 45 to 64, and 13.0% who were 65 years of age or older.  The median age was 37 years. For every 100 females, there were 81.3 males.  For every 100 females age 18 and over, there were 80.9 males.

The median income for a household in the city was $40,074, and the median income for a family was $46,957. Males had a median income of $36,415 versus $25,484 for females. The per capita income for the city was $18,911.  About 2.5% of families and 4.4% of the population were below the poverty line, including 2.4% of those under age 18 and 2.8% of those age 65 or over.

References

External links
 City of Parchment

Cities in Kalamazoo County, Michigan
Kalamazoo–Portage metropolitan area
Populated places established in 1909
1909 establishments in Michigan